"I'll Remember April" is a popular song and jazz standard with music written in 1941 by Gene de Paul, and lyrics by Patricia Johnston and Don Raye. It made its debut in the 1942 Abbott and Costello comedy Ride 'Em Cowboy, being sung by Dick Foran. The lyric uses the seasons of the year metaphorically to illustrate the growth and death of a romance. The lyric also uses the ideas of the hours in a day and the flames of a fire to illustrate a relationship growing stronger and subsequently losing strength. Another interpretation is the use of spring (the month of April) to express the loves that were had in youth and remember them when the autumn of life arrives with affection and nostalgia, smiling: "I'll remember April and I smile". The song has been described as one which makes use of nostalgia.

Since then, a number of artists have covered the song as listed below. One of the most notable live renditions of the song is a radio performance by Judy Garland, on a broadcast of Lux Radio Theatre.

'I'll Remember April' can be found in the Real Book tacit vol 1. It also appears as background music in the Adam-12 episode "Something Worth Dying For", in which Officer Reed (played by Kent McCord) is given the Medal of Valor.

Notable recordings

Cannonball Adderley for his album Cannonball's Sharpshooters (1957)
Chet Baker - for the album Witch Doctor  with The Lighthouse All Stars (1953)
Chet Baker - Paris Barclay recording 1955 Standards in Paris CD  Quartet
Shirley Bassey - included in her album The Fabulous Shirley Bassey (1959)
Clifford Brown and Max Roach from the album At Basin Street (1956) - Studio recording with Sonny Rollins
June Christy - for her album This Is June Christy (1958).,  also on Cool Christy  (2002)
Sonny Clark - a solo piano performance from the album Sonny Clark Trio (1957)
Perry Como - for his album By Request (1962)
Bing Crosby - recorded July 7, 1944 with John Scott Trotter and His Orchestra. 
Bobby Darin - for his album That's All (1959)
Miles Davis - on the 12 inch album Blue Haze (1954)
Doris Day - for the album Hooray for Hollywood (1958)
Eric Dolphy - for the album Berlin Concerts with Benny Bailey (Enja 2LPs 1961)
Bill Evans - for the album Some Other Time (1968) 
Erroll Garner - for the live album Concert by the Sea (1955)
Matthew Gee for the album Jazz by Gee (1956)
Stan Getz - for the album Stan Getz at The Shrine (1954) with Bob Brookmeyer. Also a slightly longer studio version with Bob was recorded in the Interpretations series 
Stan Getz - for his album Stan Meets Chet (1958)
Stan Getz - for his album The Stockholm Concert (1983) - Quartet
Dizzy Gillespie for the Live album The Dizzy Gillespie Big 7 (1975)
Dexter Gordon for the album Biting the Apple (1975)
Eydie Gormé included in her album Love Is a Season (1959).
Robert Goulet - for the album I Remember You (1966).
Grant Green - for the album Standards (1961) 
Hampton Hawes - for the album All Night Session! Vol. 2
Woody Herman - this charted briefly in 1942.
Ahmad Jamal from the album At the Pershing, Vol. 2
Lee Konitz - from the album Konitz (1954)
Yusef Lateef for his album Into Something (1961) flute track
Steve Lawrence - for his album Academy Award Losers (1964).
Julie London - included in her album Calendar Girl (1956)
Carmen McRae - included in her album By Special Request (1956).
Gordon MacRae - for his album The Seasons of Love (1959).
Charles Mingus - for his album The Charles Mingus Quintet & Max Roach Live at the Café Bohemia (1955)
Charles Mingus - for his album Mingus at Antibes (1960)
The Modern Jazz Quartet - from the album European Concert (1960)
Gerry Mulligan - for his album California Concerts - Zoot Sims feature (1954)
Charlie Parker - with strings (1950)
Bud Powell - Bud Powell Trio (Roost 1951)
Red Rodney - Bird Lives! (Muse 1973)
Sonny Rollins - A Night at the Village Vanguard (1957)
Dinah Shore - included in her album Moments Like These (1958).
Sonny Stitt - The Sonny Side of Stitt (Roost 1959)
Frank Sinatra - included in his album Point of No Return (1962)
Sonny Stitt Sits In with the Oscar Peterson Trio - (Verve 1960)
Billy Taylor Trio at Town Hall - (Prestige 1954)
Martha Tilton recorded June 4, 1942.
Dinah Washington from the album Dinah Jams (1954)

Film appearances
1942 Ride 'Em Cowboy, sung by Dick Foran
1944 Ghost Catchers1944 Phantom Lady1945 Eve Knew Her Apples1945 I'll Remember April'' - performed by Kirby Grant and Gloria Jean

Sources

References
"I'll Remember April" at jazzstandards.com.  Accessed 20 September 2007.

Songs about nostalgia
Songs with music by Gene de Paul
1942 songs
Songs written by Don Raye
Jazz compositions in G major